A Day Without a Mexican is a 2004 fantasy film directed by Sergio Arau in his directorial debut from a screenplay co-written with Yareli Arizmendi and Sergio Guerrero. It stars Yareli Arizmendi, John Getz, Maureen Flannigan, Muse Watson, Fernando Arau, and Eduardo Palomo. The plot offers a satirical look at the consequences of all the Mexicans in the state of California suddenly disappearing (with a mysterious "pink fog" surrounding the state preventing any communication or movement with the outside world). The film earned over $10 million at the box office and received generally negative reviews from critics.

Cast

Release
The film opened on May 14, 2004, in limited release throughout Southern California and on September 17 in theaters in Chicago, Texas, Florida, and New York City as well as San Jose.

Reception

Box office
A Day Without a Mexican grossed $5.9 million in Mexico, and $4.2 million in the United States and Canada, for a worldwide total of $10.1 million. In Mexico, the film earned $2.7 million from 330 theaters in its opening weekend. In the United States, the film as only a moderate box-office success, earning $628,807 in its first weekend.

Critical response
The film received negative reviews from critics.  

Ella Taylor of the LA Weekly describes it as, "A terrific premise is mangled to a pulp, then beaten to death in this forced mockumentary." E! was less kind, stating, "This Day not only lacks Mexicans but also good acting, sharp storytelling, and humor." At the Cartagena Film Festival, the film earned a nomination for Best Film and won Best Screenplay. It also earned a special jury award at the Gramado Film Festival and Best Editing at the Guadalajara Film Festival.

See also
 The City Without Jews

References

External links
 
 

2004 films
American mockumentary films
Mexican comedy films
Spanish comedy films
2000s mockumentary films
Films set in California
2004 comedy films
2000s English-language films
2000s American films